Wilmer is an unincorporated hamlet in the rural north of Tangipahoa Parish, Louisiana, United States. Wilmer is centered on the intersection of LA 10 and LA 1061.

The 1908 Dixie tornados killed four of the settlement's residents.

Notes

Census-designated places in Louisiana
Census-designated places in Tangipahoa Parish, Louisiana
Unincorporated communities in Tangipahoa Parish, Louisiana
Unincorporated communities in Louisiana